Lyme Park is a suburb of Johannesburg, South Africa. It is located in Region B of the City of Johannesburg Metropolitan Municipality.

Education 
Lyme Park houses a co-ordinate education to St Stithians College as a private English speaking school.

References

Johannesburg Region B